The Post Office Act 1969 (c.48) is an act of the Parliament of the United Kingdom that changed the General Post Office from a department of state to a public corporation, known as the Post Office. It also abolished the office of Postmaster General of the United Kingdom.

The powers of the Postmaster General were transferred to a new cabinet member, the Minister of Posts and Telecommunications. The incumbent Postmaster, John Stonehouse, became the first Minister of Post and Telecommunications on 1 October 1969.

The act created a new public corporation, the Post Office, as the "authority for the conduct of postal and telegraphic business". The corporation was to consist of a chairman and between six and twelve full or part-time members. The chairman was to be appointed by the minister and the other members by the minister following consultation with the chairman. The first Chairman of the Post Office was Viscount Hall.

The main powers given to the new body were:
To provide postal services (including cash on delivery services) and telecommunication services
To provide a banking service of the kind commonly known as a giro system and such other services by means of which money may be remitted (whether by means of money orders, postal orders or otherwise) as it thinks fit
To provide data processing services
To perform services for Her Majesty's Government in the United Kingdom, Her Majesty's Government in Northern Ireland or the government of a country or territory outside the United Kingdom or for local or national health service authorities in the United Kingdom.

References

United Kingdom Acts of Parliament 1969
General Post Office
Royal Mail